Blaž Božič (born 23 October 1990) is a Slovenian football midfielder who plays for Ilirija 1911.

External links
Player profile at PrvaLiga 

1990 births
Living people
Footballers from Ljubljana
Slovenian footballers
Association football midfielders
NK IB 1975 Ljubljana players
NK Olimpija Ljubljana (2005) players
ND Ilirija 1911 players
Slovenian PrvaLiga players
Slovenian Second League players
Slovenian expatriate footballers
Slovenian expatriate sportspeople in Austria
Expatriate footballers in Austria
Slovenian expatriate sportspeople in Italy
Expatriate footballers in Italy
Slovenia youth international footballers
Slovenia under-21 international footballers